Nishan is a Bengali language action drama film directed by S.S. Balan. This film was released on 4 August 1978 in the banner of Gemini Production Circuit Private Limited.

Plot
The story concerns two neighbouring kingdoms and their vendetta. Uttam Kumar played a double role as twin princes Bijay and Bikram.

Cast
 Uttam Kumar as Prince Bijay/Bikram
 Arati Bhattacharya as Ranjana
 Nazir Hussain as Doctor Shankarprasad
 Shekhar Chatterjee as King
 Sulochana Chatterjee
 Arabinda Panda
 Rajani Bala
 Mukul Ghosh
 Manik Dutta

Soundtrack
Music direction was done by Shyamal Mitra and Lyricist was Gouri Prasanna Majumdar. Lead singers of the film are Kishore Kumar, Asha Bhosle, Chandrani Mukherjee, Arati Mukhopadhyay and Shyamal Mitra.

References

1978 films
Bengali-language Indian films
Indian action films
1970s Bengali-language films
Films scored by Shyamal Mitra
1978 action films